Francis P.Mull Eugene Mullen (born January 2, 1970) is an American vocalist, best known as the former frontman for the New York technical death metal band Suffocation. He is one of the first vocalists to introduce low-pitched growling vocals into the death metal genre. He performed and recorded with the band from 1989 to 2018.

Early life 
Mullen was born on January 2, 1970, and grew up in Long Island, New York. He became a fan of metal music from a young age and was initially attracted to albums like Slayer’s Hell Awaits and Exodus's Bonded by Blood through their album cover art. He met bandmates Terrance Hobbs and Mike Smith in high school and they formed a metal cover band, Wombrot, in which he initially played bass.

Career 
In 1989, Mullen, Hobbs (guitarist), and Smith (drummer) formed the metal band Suffocation with bassist Josh Barohn and guitarist Doug Cerrito.

Suffocation released a six-song EP Human Waste in 1991. The EP was one of the first records released by Relapse Records. Their first feature-length album Effigy of the Forgotten was released the same year by Roadrunner Records. The album featured Mullen's distinct low-pitched guttural vocals. According to the Long Island Music Hall of Fame, which the band was inducted into in 2012, "Suffocation created a blueprint for death metal with its guttural vocals, downtuned guitar sounds, and fast and complex guitar riffs and drumming."

The band released their second full album Breeding the Spawn in 1993. The album was criticized for "its short length", "its perceived repetition of the predecessor's overall formula" and a "muddy final mix". The band has since re-recorded many of the songs from the album on subsequent albums. In 1995, they released Pierced From Within, "one of Suffocation's strongest albums", according to Rolling Stone. The band recorded an EP, Despise the Sun, in 1998 and released it through their band management company Vulture but it was not in wide circulation. Despise the Sun featured a different drummer, Dave Culross, who would later again replace Smith in 2012.

Suffocation subsequently broke up and did not reunite until 2002; that year Relapse Records re-released Despise the Sun. The newly re-established band included Mullen, Hobbs, Smith and Barohn, with returning band member Guy Marchais, previously with the bands Pyrexia and Internal Bleeding. In April 2004, the band released Souls to Deny before switching bassists to Derek Boyer from the band Decrepit Birth. They entered a period of heavy touring before releasing the self-titled album Suffocation in September 2006.

In 2009, Mullen was the vocalist on Blood Oath which the band released with the record label Nuclear Blast. His brutal guttural growls were particularly noted on the song "Come Hell or High Priest". Pitchfork said of Mullen's vocals, while "he spews tales of madness, megalomania, and paranoia", his "growls are surprisingly understandable".

After the release of the 2013 album Pinnacle of Bedlam, Mullen announced that he will retire from full-time touring from the band. Pinnacle of Bedlam saw the return of drummer Culross to the band since his previous appearance on Despise the Sun. Mullen and Hobbs became the only remaining original members of the band after the departure of Smith in 2012, and were joined on the band's 2017 album, ...Of the Dark Light, with guitarist Charlie Errigo, bassist Derek Boyer and drummer Eric Morotti.

Mullen retired from his musical career after a final tour with Suffocation, dubbed the Farewell Frank Tour. He made his final U.S. appearance as the lead vocalist for the band in their performance at Nightclub Reverb in Reading, Pennsylvania on November 17, 2018. Mullen's performance featured plenty of his signature stage move, the death chop, from which the tour gets its tagline, Death Chopping North America. He was succeeded as lead vocalist for Suffocation by Rick Myers, who on several occasions had filled-in for him. Mullen later reprised his role for the band's Japanese tour in 2019 before again relinquishing the position to Myers.

Personal life 
Mullen enjoys listening to various types of music. When asked what he listened to, he said, "I don't know, I mean I listen to a little bit of everything. I'm a big fan of like Stevie Ray Vaughan, Run-DMC, old hard rock, The Who, The Doors, Janet Jackson, Zeppelin."

Mullen is an atheist; he has said "I don't believe in [one or the other religion]. So my religious views are on, I guess, an atheist point."

He married Natalie Henriquez in July, 2019. At their wedding, he sang "Entrails of You", a "love song" from Suffocation's 2006 self-titled album. He shared a video of the performance on his Facebook fan page that drew more than 120,000 views.

References 

1970 births
20th-century American singers
20th-century American male singers
21st-century American singers
21st-century American male singers
American atheists
American heavy metal singers
Death metal musicians
Living people
People from Long Island
Suffocation (band) members